Baramati railway station is a railway station in Pune district. Its code is BRMT. It serves Baramati city. The station consists of two platforms. It comes under Central Railways division of Indian Railways.

Trains 
Some of the trains that runs from Baramati are:

 Baramati–Pune Passenger
 Baramati–Daund Passenger (unreserved)
 Baramati–Daund Shuttle (unreserved)
 Baramati–Karjat Passenger (unreserved)
 Baramati–Pune Shuttle (unreserved)

Future 
Baramati railway station lacks a lot of facilities. In a few years, the station might go through redevelopment.
There will be a new rail line connection from Phaltan to Baramati so that trains from Kolhapur and Hubli section can freely go towards Manmad, as these train currently change to the reverse direction in Pune and Daund.

Some redevelopment might contain:

 expansion of two more platforms and sheltering the existing platform.
 construction of an electric loco shed as the Lonand to Phaltan rail line is still a diesel line.

References

Railway stations in Pune district
Pune railway division
Baramati